Cymindis budensis is a species of ground beetle in the subfamily Harpalinae. It was described by Csiki in 1908.

References

budensis
Beetles described in 1908